The Évence Coppée Trophy was a one-off competition comprising a single association football match in 1904 between Belgium and France. Held at the Stade du Vivier d'Oie in Uccle, Belgium, the match ended in a 3–3 draw.

The trophy was named after Évence Coppée, the Belgian patron who organised the match to promote Franco-Belgian friendship. Because the game ended in a tie, the trophy itself was not awarded.

Historical context 
The Évence Coppée Trophy marked the official debut of the French and Belgian national football teams and was also the first match between two independent European countries. It was the third official international football game in continental Europe, after the games between Austria and Hungary, and Hungary and Bohemia. It was the third official game between the sides of two independent countries, after matches between Argentina and Uruguay in 1902 and 1903.

Twenty days after the match, Belgium, France and five other European football associations founded the international association football federation, FIFA.

Pre-match 

Both teams were selected by their National Football Association (with Belgian chairman Édouard de Laveleye and French chairman Robert Guérin) rather than by a national manager. Because of transportation difficulties and army enrollment, the French delegation was decimated. Since 1 May was not yet considered an international holiday, the French players had to ask for a day off from their employees. At least two French players (Louis Mesnier and Fernand Canelle) left their country without permission from their employers, and in French reports these two players were referred to using the respective pseudonyms "Didi" and "Fernand".

The French tactics were described as follows. "France play in a classical 2-3-5 formation: two backs, the two half-wingers (G. Bilot and especially C. Bilot) are defensive and hold the opponent's wingers, Davy is half-center. Finally, there are the five forwards. The 'exteriors' Mesnier and Filez who make a break, the 'interiors' are Royet (who is relay runner) and Cyprès and the powerful center (Garnier), who is also the playmaker."

France played in a white jersey with two rings from the Union des Sociétés Françaises de Sports Athlétiques (USFS), the former sports governing body in France, blue shorts, and red socks.

The match

Post-match 
Despite scoring twice in this match, the Belgian striker Georges Quéritet was not selected again for the national side.

The Belgian goalkeeper Alfred Verdyck later became the secretary-general of the Belgian FA. Robert Guérin, the deputy of the French Football Association, became the first president of FIFA twenty days after this match.

All Franco-Belgian encounters 

Belgium and France have sustained a long-lasting rivalry since this first fixture, with 74 official matches played over more than a century.

The full record between the two countries is as follows:

*Including two friendly matches at minor tournaments: the Évence Coppée Trophy in 1904 (3–3), and a 1–0 victory for France at the King Hassan II Tournament in 1998.

 See also 

List of first association football internationals per country
Belgium national football team
France national football team
History of the France national football team

 Further reading 
 Belgique-France, 1er mai 1904... » in Thierry Hubac, 1904–2004. Un siècle en Bleu, Mango Sport, 2004, pp 8–9.
 Le match par lequel tout commença », in France Football'', Tuesday 25 December 2001, pp 10–11.
 L'Équipe de France de Football : L'intégrale des 497 rencontres de 1904 à 1991, by Pierre Cazal, Michel Oreggia and Jean-Michel Cazal

References 

1903–04 in Belgian football
1903–04 in French football
European football trophies and awards
Belgium national football team matches
France national football team matches
May 1904 sports events